The M-5 motorway, also known as Multan–Sukkur Motorway, is a north–south motorway in Pakistan, which connects Multan with Sukkur. The motorway is a 392 km long, high-speed (120 km/h), controlled-access, six-lane motorway that forms part of the China-Pakistan Economic Corridor.

It is currently the longest motorway in Pakistan.

History

The approval for the Multan-Sukkur Motorway (M-5) was granted in July 2014, with an estimated cost of Rs. 200 billion. In May 2016, the Pakistani government awarded the contract to build this section to China State Construction Engineering, with the completion date being August 2019. Former Prime Minister Nawaz Sharif performed the groundbreaking on 6 May 2016, while the actual ground work started in August 2016.

The M-5 motorway project forms a cornerstone of the much-larger China–Pakistan Economic Corridor. Construction covered 21 Chinese residential camps and 23 Pakistani workers camps with hundreds of working sites, directly providing jobs to nearly 30,000 Pakistanis at peak time. The motorway was inaugurated on 5 November 2019 in the 9th Joint Cooperation Committee (JCC) meeting in Islamabad.

Cost and financing
The total cost of the motorway was estimated to be around $2.89 billion.The Multan–Sukkur Motorway (M-5) cost approximately $2.94 billion, with the bulk of financing financed by various Chinese state-owned banks.
90% of the project's cost was financed through concessionary loans on interest rates of 1.6% from China, while the remaining balance is financed by government of Pakistan.

Route
Starting from Multan, the six-lane motorway passes through Jalalpur Pirwala, Ahmedpur East, Rahimyar Khan, Sadiqabad, Ubauro, and Pano Aqil before it terminates at Sukkur. The project consists of 54 bridges, including one major bridge on the river Sutlej. The motorway has 12 service areas, 10 rest areas, 11 interchanges, 10 flyovers, and 426 underpasses.

Interchanges

References

M05
M5
China–Pakistan Economic Corridor